Lucretia Newman Coleman (1856 – July 31, 1948) was an African-American writer born in Canada to a fugitive slave. Fluent at the end of the nineteenth-century, her works were praised by her contemporaries of the African-American press.

Early life
Lucretia Howe Newman was born in Dresden, Southwestern Ontario, Canada to Nancy D. (née Brown) and William P. Newman. Her father was a runaway slave from Virginia, who was ordained as a Baptist minister after attending Oberlin College in 1842 and 1843. He pastored for a few years at the Union Baptist Church of Cincinnati, making numerous mission trips to Canada. After the Fugitive Slave Act of 1850 passed, he settled his family in Ontario, where they remained until 1859. During this time, Lucretia was born around 1854. At that time, the family of six went to Haiti to investigate the possibility of settling there, but the prevalence of Catholicism made him turn his sights to Jamaica. In 1863, he determined to return to the United States and settled again in Cincinnati, resuming his pastorate at Union Baptist. He died in 1866 during a cholera epidemic.

Some accounts state that Newman's mother died after the family moved to Appleton, Wisconsin, and a 13-month illness ensued. Others state that when the family moved to Appleton in 1867 following Rev. Newman's death, the family matriarch was Newman's step-mother, Sarah Cleggett Newman. The family lived a block away from the Cleggett family home in Appleton. In 1872, Newman enrolled in Lawrence University to study sciences, as one of the first black students at the university. Some of her biographers have said that Newman graduated from Lawrence, but university archives show she was only there for two years and did not earn a degree. The family left Appleton in 1876.

Career
After her studies, Newman became a music teacher and worked in a dry goods store, before being hired as a secretary and book keeper for the African Methodist Episcopal Church in 1883. That same year, her first known work, "Lucille of Montana", was published in Our Women and Children to acclaim. In 1884, Newman married Robert J. Coleman in Des Moines, Iowa and soon afterwards moved to Minneapolis, Minnesota. Their daughter, Alberta Roberta was born in 1886 while they lived in Minnesota, Coleman's home included her brother Albert Newman. Through the 1880s and 1890s, she published in such volumes as the A.M.E. Church Review and the American Baptist and her works were widely praised in black journals for the scientific and philosophical depth of the writing. Her novel, Poor Ben: A Story of Real Life (1890), was critically acclaimed by her contemporaries and in 1894, she served as a vice president of the Colored Authors' Association.

By the 1920s, she and her daughter were living in Chicago, where she listed her occupation as dressmaker. She died in 1948 in Grand Rapids, Michigan, where she is interred at the Woodlawn Cemetery.

Notes

Selected works

References

Citations

Bibliography

1856 births
1948 deaths
19th-century American novelists
19th-century American women writers
African-American novelists
African-American women writers
American women novelists
Black Canadian writers
Pre-Confederation Canadian emigrants to the United States
People from Chatham-Kent
20th-century African-American people
20th-century African-American women